The National Conference on Crimes Against Children held in Washington, D.C. in 1993 and 1994 was noted for its impact on judicial, prosecutorial, educational, and legislative issues. The conference was one of the first bi-partisan supported conferences that involved three presidential administrations, and more than three hundred national experts on the sexual exploitation of children, gangs, and trafficking of children.

The 1993 conference focus was The Sexual Exploitation of Children: Creating an Investigative and Research Agenda for the 21st Century. The 1994 conference focus was "The Physical and Sexual Exploitation of Children: Evolving Strategies & Challenges to Research, Investigation and Prosecution".

The conference founder and director was Randel (Randy) H. Skinner, a consultant to federal, state, and local law enforcement agencies. Skinner continues his work in this arena in over forty states with a major emphasis in Georgia, California, Mississippi (historic civil rights cases) and Texas.

The conference included noted speakers from the Reagan, Bush, and Clinton administrations, and nationally recognized scholars on child advocacy. The conferences were also instrumental in the advocacy of the Jacob Wetterling Crimes Against Children Sex Offender Registration Act which passed in 1994.

History
In 1989, Skinner coordinated a group of fifteen concerned law enforcement agencies from across Georgia, who met to explore the connection between white supremacist groups and the increase in crimes against African American youth. They also explored the increase in aberrant religious belief systems tied to familial homicides and the use of Santeria and Palo Mayombe in drug trafficking cases. This collaborative work developed into an educational component used to train law enforcement agencies nationwide throughout the 1990s.

Skinner, concerned about the amount of violence against children, notably the increase in inner-city gang violence across the nation; increase in trafficking of children and rise in the sexual exploitation of children, decided to bring together the leading authorities on prosecution, investigation, and public policy to combat crimes against children. This led to the formation of the 1993 and 1994 Conference on Crimes Against Children.

In 1995, the focus turned to crimes against children across Mississippi and California, leading to work in both those states with national experts to increase the protection of Children. In Mississippi, Skinner traveled in 1996 – 1999 over 100,000 miles expanding his work on historic civil rights cases whose murders were unsolved.  Skinner worked with statewide groups on racial reconciliation and restoration calling for justice in unsolved cases. By 1999, over twelve civil rights murder cases were solved with convictions, led by courageous prosecutors.

Speakers
The conference speakers included United States Attorney General Ed Meese and nationally known advocate Miss America Marilyn Van Derber. Some of the noted scholars in the field of child advocacy included Dr. Ann Burgess PhD, Dr. Bruce D. Perry, PH.D, Dr. Robert Kirshner, M.D., Hon. Sol Gothard, and Hon. Kathleen Kearney.

Advocates included Sherry Quirk of Washington, D.C., Dee Jepsen of Enough is Enough and Susan Hall of Alliance for the Children in Virginia.

Law enforcement experts were Det. William Dworin of Los Angeles, Det. Brian Killacky and Jerry Simandl of Chicago, Florida State Attorney Larry Lawson, U.S. Customs Expert John Sullivan and Lt. Toby Tyler and Al Valdez of California. Other noted speakers included Hon. Charles B. Schudson, Hon. Gene Malpus, Lloyd deMaus, Brian Fassett, author Jason Berry, Dr. M Sharian Julian, Hon. Rob Showers, Paul Thomson, Dr. Marlene Young, Dr. Jack Enter, Ken Wooden, Hon Joy Watson among many others.

1993 Conference topics and speakers
Interviewing and Communication Techniques with the Sexually Abused Child

The Police Response and Investigation of Child Sex Abuse in Institutions

Forensic and Legal Implications of Interviewing Sexually Abused Children

The Response to Political Pressure in Child Sex Abuse Cases

The Toxic Effects of Investigating Child Sex Abuse Cases

The Law Enforcement Response to Investigative Reporters

Expert Testimony Regarding Child Sexual Abuse

Children in Court: Techniques for Direct Examination/Cross Examination

Prosecution of Child Sexual Offenders in Institutions (Day Care, etc.)

The Attorney's Challenge the Findings of Sexual Assault and Evidentiary Exam

A Psychological Profile of Childhood Histories of Incest and Involvement in Pornography and/or Destructive Cults

The Recruitment Techniques of Destructive Cults

Problems of Dissociation, Amnesia and Multiple Personality Disorder in Assessing Survivor Accounts

Techniques on How the Sexual Perpetrator Breaks down a child's barriers

Redefining Existing Profiles of the Child Molester

Management Strategies in Child Sexual Abuse: A Comparison of Law Enforcement,
Medical and Child Protective Services

Selected State Legislation on the Sexual Abuse of Children

Gang Violence and Its Effects on our Nation's Children

Profiling Youth Susceptible to Cults, Gangs, and Neo-Nazi Movement

Targeting Professions which Attract Child Sex Offenders

Developing Guidelines and Policy for Organizations and Institutions at Risk

1994 Conference topics
″Law Enforcement and Prosecutorial Strategies″

Introduction to West Coast Gangs and Intervention - Al Valdez, Spec. Invest.

Profiling Pedophilia Activity: Victim Interviewing Insights – Det. Bill Dworin

Children in Court: The Task Force Concept for Successful Pros. - Hon. Gene Malpus

An Approach to Organized Child Abuse - Sgt. Kurt Jackson, Beaumont, Calif PD

Sting Operation Methods Using Ads and Media – Lt. Toby Tyler, California

Targeting Professions Which Attract Child Offenders - Panel: Inv. Larry Lawson, Special Agent Don Robinson, Inv. Ronnie Blasingame, Joan Pennington, Hon. Gene Malpus

Sexual Assault and Evidentiary Exams - Rob Showers, Pres. Of Natl. Law Center

The Art and Science of Forensic Interviewing Techniques - Panel: Steven Mayo - Forensics, William Dworin, Brian Killacky, Toby Tyler

Enterprising Investigative Techniques for Successful Prosecutions - Workshop by Ronnie Blasingame

Making Courts Safe for Children - Hon. Charles Schudson, Wisconsin

Street Gangs Today - Identification of Midwest Street Gangs - Jerry Simandl, Chicago

The Investigation of Interpersonal Violence Against Children - Brian Killacky, Chicago

The Use of Scientific and Psychological Testimony in Court - Hon Kathleen Kearney

Investigation of Multi-Victim/Multi-Perpetrator Child Abuse Crimes - Larry Lawson

Case Evaluation Strategies: Turning Difficult Cases - Stephen Mayor, Forensics

Gangs, A National Epidemic - Al Valdez, Jerry Simandl, Spec. Agent Don Robinson

Investigators Championing for Children - Toby Tyler, Bill Dworin, Jim Souza

Concentric Circles: Understanding Child Pornography, Child Prostitution and Ritual

Abuse Through Case Link Analysis - Jim Souza, M.ED

Sexual Assault and Evidentiary Exams - Rob Showers, Esq

Investigation and Prosecution of Child Abuse - Robert Parrish, Asst. Utah Atty. Gen.

Juvenile Prostitution: The Overlooked Form of Child Sexual Abuse - Sgt. Bryron Fassett

Panel: The Art and Science of Forensic Interviewing Techniques - Steven Mayo, Forensic Consultant, Sgt. Kurt Jackson, Det. William Dworin, Det. Brian Killacky, Sgt. Toby Tyler.

″Medical and Psychiatric Issues″

Personal Account of Childhood Sexual Abuse - Marlyn Van Derber

Psychological Profile of Adults with Repressed Childhood Memories - Ann Burgess, Ph.D.

Neurological Development of Children Raised in Psychologically Destructive Cults - Bruce Perry, Ph.D.

Understanding Traumatization and Multiple Personality Victims - Jim Freisen, Ph.D.

Are We Letting People Get Away With Murder? Medical Aspects of Child Abuse - Robert Kirschner, M.D.

Are the Victims Lying? False Memory, False Science or Falsifying the Truth? Defining and Proving Child Sexual Abuse in Various Courts - Hon. Sol Gothard, J.D. MSW,

Panel: A Historical, Medical, & Psychological Profile of the Child Abuse Victims - Shari Julian, Ph.D., Ann Burgess Ph.D., and Robert Kirschner, Ph.D.

The Battle of the Backlash: Myth and Realities in Sexual Abuse of Children -
Hon. Sol Gothard, JS, MSW, ACSW Court of Appeals

False Memory Issues and Mandated Reporting Laws - Sherry Quirk, Esg., Sharri Julian, Ph.D., Hon. Kathleen Kearney, Hon. Sol Gothard and Renee Rich

Treating the Ritual Abuse Victim - Randy Noblitt, Ph.D.

Victims of the Female Perpetrator - Sharri Julian, Ph.D.

Concentric Circles: Understanding Child Pornography, Child Prostitution and Ritual

Abuse Through Case Link Analysis - Jim Souza, M.ED

Child Abuse Trends and the Diagnosis - Sue Hawthorn, Mississippi

Programming: Utilizing Accessing Techniques in the Evaluation & Treatment of Ritual Abuse in Victims - Randy Noblitt, Ph.D.

Youth Susceptible to Cults: A Profile- Bill Reisman, Consultant Rapha Hospital

The Use of Scientific and Psychological Testimony in Court - Hon. Kathy Kearney

Making Courts Safe for Children - Judge Charles Schudson

Panel: False Memory Issues: Attorney's Challenging the Findings - Hon. Kathy Kearney, Sherry Quirk, Esg.

Priest Pedophilia Scandals: A Mirror of the Larger Crisis - Jason Berry, Journalist

″Child Advocacy and Legislation″

The Forgotten Child - Joan Pennington, National Center for Protective Parents

Childhood Sexual Abuse: Legislative Issues and Developments – Sherry Quirk, Esq

Legislation and Its Impact on Reducing Sexual Violence Against Women and Children – Dee Jepsen

Wake Up Call – Issues that Threaten the Very Existence of Child Advocates

The International Exploitation of Children - Paul B. Thompson, VP of World Vision

Building Effective Advocacy Organizations Influencing State Leg. – Susan Hall

Targeting Professions Which Attract Child Offenders - Panel: Inv. Larry Lawson, Spec. Agent Don Robinson, Inv. Ronnie Blasingame, Joan Pennington, Gene Malpus

Strategic Community Assistance to Victims of Physical and Sexual Abuse - Marlene Young Ph.D.

Developing and Implementing Effective State Legislation - Panel: Rob Parrish, Susan Barker Hall, Sue Hawthorn, Sherry Quirk

Building a National Communication Network - Panel: Spec. Agent Don Robinson, Robert Parrish, Sgt. Kurt Jackson, Inv. Ronnie Blasingame

Case Evaluation Strategies: Turning Around Difficult Cases - Stephen Mayo

References

1993 conferences
Conferences in the United States